Red cell may refer to:

 Red blood cell, a type of cell in the blood that transports oxygen
 Red Cell, a term in US government parlance for teams that test the effectiveness of tactics
 "Red Cell" (NCIS), an episode in the TV series NCIS
 Red Cell, a prominent terrorist group in the TV series La Femme Nikita (TV series)